Lucie Bethan Jones (born 20 March 1991) is a Welsh singer, musical theatre actress, and model. Jones first came to prominence while competing on series 6 of The X Factor UK in 2009, where she finished eighth. She represented the United Kingdom in the Eurovision Song Contest 2017 with the song "Never Give Up on You", finishing with 111 points in 15th place.

Life and career

Jones was born in Pentyrch, a small village outside Cardiff. In 2007, she attended the World Scout Jamboree as a Scout, and was the main performer singing "Jambo", the theme song of the jamboree. Lucie was also a part of Cardiff's own Scout and Guide Gang Show. In 2017, she married fellow X Factor contestant Ethan Boroian.

The X Factor
Jones auditioned for series 6 of The X Factor UK with the song "I Will Always Love You". She advanced to the live shows, and was mentored by Dannii Minogue. Jones was eliminated in week five, during the final showdown against John & Edward after the result went to deadlock with Louis Walsh and Simon Cowell voting to eliminate Jones while Minogue and Cheryl Cole voted to send home John & Edward. After her elimination, 1,113 viewers complained about Cowell sending the result to deadlock rather than sending home John & Edward in a majority vote.

West End
After being eliminated from The X Factor, Jones was signed to Select Model Management, and began a modelling career. In May 2010, Jones was signed by Cameron Mackintosh to play Cosette in the West End production of Les Misérables. In September 2010, she was revealed to be the face of Wonderbra's Full Effects campaign. In 2010, she appeared in The Sarah Jane Adventures episode, "Lost in Time: Part Two". Jones played the role of Meat in the 2013 arena tour of We Will Rock You. Jones also played the role of Victoria in the musical American Psycho at the Almeida Theatre in December 2013.

In February 2015, Jones appeared as Melody Carver in ITV's Midsomer Murders, in the episode "The Ballad of Midsomer County". In April 2015, Jones played the role of Emma in the showcase performance of Like Me, at The Waterloo East Theatre. In March 2015, she was cast as Molly in the Chinese tour of Ghost the Musical. In April 2016, she played the lead role of Elle Woods in  Legally Blonde at the Curve. In 2016, she was cast as Maureen Johnson in the UK tour of Rent. Jones appeared in a summer run as Holly in the UK Tour of The Wedding Singer from 20 June to 19 July 2017. Between September 2017 and June 2018 she reprised her role as Elle Woods in a UK tour of Legally Blonde.

Jones made her debut as Jenna in Waitress on 17 June 2019, taking over from Katharine McPhee. For 2 weeks from 13 January 2020, she was briefly replaced by Desi Oakley (who had played Jenna in the US tour) due to an illness that also affected her two understudies. From 27 January to 21 March 2020, the role was to be played by Sara Bareilles for an 8-week run, with Jones stepping back into the role until the show closed on 4 July 2020. However, on 14 March 2020, the show closed early due to the COVID-19 pandemic. Jones reprised the role of Jenna on 4 September 2021 for the rescheduled UK & Ireland tour (originally set to start November 2020).

In Summer 2021, Jones took on the role of Fantine in the West End production of Les Misérables, ending on 29 August 2021 so that she could resume her role as Jenna in Waitress for the 2021/2022 UK Tour, starting on 4 September 2021.

Jones made her debut as Elphaba in Wicked at London's Apollo Victoria Theatre on 1 February 2022. She concluded her run in the show on 4 March 2023. She is now set to reprise the role of Fantine in the West End production of Les Miserables on 27 March 2023, taking over the role from Ava Brennan. 

Lucie Jones will be doing a tour date tour with The Fulltone Orchestra in April and May 2023 https://fto.org.uk/lucie/.

Eurovision Song Contest 2017

In January 2017, Jones competed in Eurovision: You Decide, the United Kingdom's national final for the Eurovision Song Contest 2017. Her song, "Never Give Up on You", was co-written by Eurovision Song Contest 2013 winner Emmelie de Forest. On 27 January 2017, Jones won the televised show, and was confirmed to be representing the United Kingdom in the Eurovision Song Contest 2017, in Kyiv.

Jones's performance was shown in excerpt at the first semi-final of the Eurovision and, following this, betting odds went on to surge. At the Grand Final Jones performed eighteenth in the running order and then, in the second half of the final, went on to score 111 points through combined voting from the jury vote and the popular vote. Jones also managed to score 12 points from the Australia professional Jury. An article in the International Business Times stated that she blamed Brexit for the "disappointing" result though Jones said in a televised interview with the BBC that she had noticed no effect from Brexit in the attitude towards her from fellow contestants and fans of the show.

Discography

Albums

Extended plays

Singles

Filmography

Stage

References

External links

 
 
 Lucie Jones on the UK Theater Web
 Lucie Jones on Magic at the Musicals

1991 births
Living people
21st-century Welsh women singers
21st-century Welsh actresses
Welsh stage actresses
Welsh musical theatre actresses
Welsh people of English descent
Eurovision Song Contest entrants for the United Kingdom
Eurovision Song Contest entrants of 2017
The X Factor (British TV series) contestants
Welsh female models
Welsh television actresses
Actresses from Cardiff
Singers from Cardiff
People educated at Radyr Comprehensive School